The 1981 Atlanta Mayoral Election took place on October 6, 1981, with the runoff held on October 27.  Mayor Maynard Jackson was ineligible to run due to term limits.  The runoff featured two prominent Atlanta politicians: former Congressman and UN Ambassador Andrew Young as well as State Representative Sidney Marcus.  Young won in the October 27th runoff by double digits.  It became the first time an African American mayor (Jackson) handed over the keys of a major city to another African American.

Election results

References

Atlanta
1981
Atlanta, Georgia